Marilyn Knowlden (born May 12, 1926) is an American former child actress. She started appearing in Hollywood films in 1931 when she was four years old. She established herself as a freelancer who worked frequently at different major film studios throughout the decade, being cast in films such as Imitation of Life, Les Misérables, and Angels with Dirty Faces. She worked with film stars such as Katharine Hepburn, James Cagney, and Claudette Colbert. In total, six of the films in which she appeared were nominated for an Academy Award for Best Picture, all within the span of seven years.

She retired from film acting when she became an adult, but was active in local theatre productions as a playwright and composer. She is considered to be one of the last surviving actors from the 1930s period of Hollywood's Golden Years.

Early life
Marilyn Knowlden was born on May 12, 1926, in Oakland, California. Her parents were Robert E. Knowlden Jr. (1896–1972), a Utah-born attorney (and later her agent), and Bertha McKenzie. They married on December 23, 1921. She was an only child. When she was nearly three years old, in early 1929, she entered a beauty pageant for babies and was crowned the winner. She started taking dance lessons at the age of three. One of her teachers saw her show business potential early on, and was convinced that she would make it in the entertainment industry. Among others, she was tutored by Russian-born ballet dancer, choreographer, and actor Theodore Kosloff.

Career in Hollywood (1931–1944)
In 1931, Knowlden's father got her a screen test for the Paramount Pictures film Women Love Once while the whole family was visiting Hollywood for reasons related to Robert's work. He had called Fred Datig, a casting director at Paramount. Despite her young age, she managed to handle a speaking part with many lines without any problems. Due to child labor laws at the time, the family had to get permission for her to be able to work. They survived a car accident that day. Bertha had to be hospitalized for injuring her collar bone and a rib. Marilyn herself was only slightly injured and got help from actress Dolores Costello, who happened to witness the event. As promotion for the film, she performed at cinemas right before it would start. Her debut was met with praise from various newspapers at the time.

Knowlden worked steadily in films, many high-budget ones, throughout the 1930s. She was often cast as the daughter of the main characters, or as the leading lady in her childhood. Looking like a younger version of the actress cast as the leading lady was often a major reason why she was cast in a certain role. Unlike most actors, children and adults alike, during the studio system era, she was never contracted to a particular studio. Apart from a temporary period during the filming of Marie Antoinette when she studied at Metro-Goldwyn-Mayer's Little Red Schoolhouse, she went to public school instead of schools for child actors in Hollywood. She was in Greta Garbo and Clark Gable's 1931 film Susan Lenox (Her Fall and Rise) but her scenes were deleted in the final cut. In 1933, Knowlden had an uncredited role as a young Flora in the pre-code drama Little Women, which starred Katharine Hepburn, and was nominated for an Academy Award for Best Picture at the 6th Academy Awards in 1934.

By 1934, Knowlden was seen as one of the few child actors to have established herself in a competitive industry. She was one of three actresses to portray Jessie Pullman (at age eight) in the 1934 Universal Pictures film Imitation of Life. Over 100 children had auditioned for the part that she ultimately got. The film, based on Fannie Hurst's 1933 novel of the same name, dealt with the topic of passing (a theme that would again be explored in a film that she appeared in a couple of years later, Show Boat). She played Claudette Colbert's character's daughter as a child. It was nominated for an Academy Award for Best Picture at the 7th Academy Awards the next year. In 2005, the film was selected for preservation in the United States National Film Registry for being deemed "culturally, historically, or aesthetically significant".

Knowlden appeared in two Academy Award-nominated films for Best Picture the following year, David Copperfield, and Les Misérables. David Copperfield was based on Charles Dickens' 1850 novel, directed by George Cukor, and released by MGM. It was Freddie Bartholomew's debut in Hollywood. She played David's foster sister Agnes Wickfield as a child. Despite both being cast in the same film, she never met comedic actor W.C. Fields on the set. Her piano playing can be heard in one scene. Les Misérables, directed by Richard Boleslawski, was based on French author Victor Hugo's 1862 novel of the same name. Having both played the same character in Imitation of Life, Knowlden and Rochelle Hudson did it once again in Les Misérables when they portrayed Cosette during different moments of the film. Knowlden's face can be seen on most DVD covers of the film, which starred Fredric March and Charles Laughton. Her performance was described as "memorable" and "excellent" by various newspapers. She would be cast in another one of Boleslawski's films, Metropolitan, later that year.

Knowlden had a small part as Florence Udney in the 1936 epic historical drama film Anthony Adverse, again with Fredric March in a leading role, and Olivia de Havilland as his leading lady. It was nominated for Best Picture at the 9th Academy Awards the following year. She was cast in Rainbow on the River (1936), starring Bobby Breen, one of the few children's films that Knowlden ever appeared in. A reviewer from Detroit Free Press lauded her performance as Lucille Layton, calling her "a fine little actress". In the 1938 historical drama film Marie Antoinette, she portrayed princess Marie Thérèse of France, daughter of the title character, which was played by Norma Shearer. She also played Laurie Martin, James Cagney's character's love interest, as a child in Angels with Dirty Faces the same year.

Knowlden was considered for the role of Carreen O'Hara, Scarlett O'Hara's youngest sister, in Gone With the Wind, which ultimately went to the decade-older actress Ann Rutherford. Towards the end of her film career, she made an appearance in All This, and Heaven Too (1940), with Bette Davis and Charles Boyer. She played Marianna van Horn, one of the school students. This was the sixth time that she was in a film that became nominated for Best Picture by the Academy Awards.

The last film she appeared in was The Way of All Flesh in 1940.

Later life
Knowlden attended Beverly Hills High School. She retired from acting in films in 1944 to concentrate on her educational studies, and developing her musical and dramatic skills. She was attending the private California-based liberal arts and sciences college Mills College, majoring in music and drama, when she met and married the World War II Army Captain Richard Goates on July 30, 1946, at the All Saints Episcopal Church in San Leandro. They had met three years earlier. She accompanied her husband  in his assignment in China and Japan, and became a radio announcer for the United States  Armed Forces Radio Station in Nanking, which gave them better accommodations than the barracks. The call sign at her radio station was XMAG. They were also stationed in Yokohama and Shanghai. Leaving the military and returning to the United States, Richard enrolled at Stanford University while Marilyn supported him through school. He graduated in business, but not before they had their first child, Carolyn. He then attained his MBA, and they had two more children, Brian and Kevin, plus one foster child. She went back to Mills College as a student at the age of 50. She later divorced Richard and married Eliseo Busnardo.

Throughout most of her post-Hollywood life, Knowlden was a musician, songwriter and playwright, authoring a number of songs and musical plays. She often worked with Richard on these projects. For instance, they wrote a local musical called Never Put Off Until Tomorrow in 1962 in association with their Church of Jesus Christ of Latter-day Saints church. Richard ran a transportation business at the time. She moved to Fallbrook in 1983. Then, at the age of 69, she had a leading role in a local theater production of My Fair Lady and continued in a variety of roles. Cinecon honored her with a lifetime achievement award at the Cinecon Classic Movies Festival in September 2010. The award was presented to her by actress Marsha Hunt, with whom she had appeared in the 1936 film Easy to Take. In 2011, she published an autobiography she had written, Little Girl in Big Pictures, describing her experiences as a child actress during the golden years of Hollywood, and telling "the rest of the story" about her life. She has fond memories of her time in Hollywood, and was always supported by her parents. She lives in a retirement home in California. In 2015, she was said to be one of the few people still alive that were working in Hollywood in the 1930s.

Filmography

Citations

General bibliography 
 Dixie Willson, Little Hollywood Stars, Akron, OH; New York: Saalfield Pub. Co., 1935. .
 Marilyn Knowlden, Little Girl in Big Pictures: Autobiography of Marilyn Knowlden, Albany, Ga.: BearManor Media, 2011. .

External links
 
 

1926 births
20th-century American actresses
Actresses from Oakland, California
American child actresses
American film actresses
Living people
Mills College alumni
Writers from Oakland, California
Paramount Pictures contract players
RKO Pictures contract players
Warner Bros. contract players
Metro-Goldwyn-Mayer contract players
20th Century Studios contract players